Liyuan opera is a form of Chinese opera originating in Quanzhou city, Fujian province, China. In recent years, one of Liyuan opera's staunchest advocates and most celebrated performers has been Zeng Jingping. At the 2009 NPC session, she proposed incorporating the study of traditional operas into the national school curriculum.

References

Chinese opera
Culture in Fujian
Hokkien opera styles